Thestor brachycerus, the Knysna skolly, is a species of butterfly in the family Lycaenidae. It is endemic to South Africa.

The wingspan is 27–36 mm for males and 29–39 mm for females. Adults are on the wing from December to January. There is one generation per year.

Larvae have been found in the nests of the pugnacious ant, Anoplolepis custodiens, but the larval food is unknown.

Subspecies
Thestor brachycerus brachycerus – seaside skolly
Range: Western Cape, confined to the heads at Knysna
Thestor brachycerus dukei van Son, 1951 – Duke's skolly
Range: Karoo and fynbos along the Langeberg from Die Koo to Montagu, then along the Swartberg and Elandsberg to the Outeniqua Mountains and along the southern Western Cape coast from Kogelberg to Stanford

References

Thestor
Butterflies described in 1883
Endemic butterflies of South Africa
Taxa named by Roland Trimen
Taxonomy articles created by Polbot